Bhavani is a 2011 Indian Tamil-language crime action film directed by G. Kicha and starring Sneha in the titular role as the police officer. The film also has Vivek, Sampath Raj, and Kota Srinivasa Rao. Others in the cast include Aryan and Yasmin Khan. It is a remake of the Telugu film Karthavyam (1990). The film was released in Tamil on 11 March 2011.

Plot 
Bhavani (Sneha), an honest police officer in Hyderabad, is posted as Assistant Commissioner of Police in Tirunelveli upon the request of the Tamil Nadu government. The town is controlled by Sivalingam (Kota Srinivasa Rao), a baddie and aspiring politician who indulges in all unlawful activities. Bhavani resolves to put an end to all his acts. Meanwhile, Surya (Sampath Raj) voices against Sivalingam. As it happens, Sivalingam's son Ranjith (Aryan) plays spoilsport in the life of Bhavani's sister Deepa (Yasmin Khan). Efforts to prove him guilty by Bhavani end in vain. Now, a conspiracy is hatched by Bhavani in the company of Surya, and Ranjith is killed. An enraged Sivalingam takes Bhavani head-on. Sivalingam vows vengeance, and what happens from there forms the rest of the story.

Cast 

 Sneha as ACP Bhavani
 Vivek as Ghirivalam
 Sampath Raj as Surya
 Kota Srinivasa Rao as Sivalingam
 Aryan as Ranjith
 Yasmin Khan as Deepa
 Vanitha Krishnachandran as Deepa's mother
 Delhi Ganesh as Bhavani's father
 Rajkapoor
 Paravai Muniyamma
 Ponnambalam
 Manobala as Ramakrishnan
Cell Murugan
Ilavarasu as Shanmugam
Boys Rajan

Production 
The film began production as Bhavani IPS before the title was shortened to Bhavani. The film, being in the action genre, was a departure for Sneha who was then known mainly for her girl next door roles. She learned stunts to do stunt scenes in the film and has done bike-racing chasing scenes. She did her stunt scenes on her own for this movie and got hurt too many times. The shooting started in Tirunelveli, and the filming was canned for 25 days continuously and the second schedule took place in Chennai and the third in Hyderabad. The film was shot within a short span of 65 days. The film was shot simultaneously in Tamil and Telugu, with Brahmanandam starring in the Telugu version. The Telugu version failed to have a theatrical release.

Soundtrack 
The music was composed by Dhina.

Release and reception 
Bhavani was released on 11 March 2011 after a week from the scheduled release date of 4 March 2011 due to financial problems. The film opened to mixed reviews of critic praising Sneha, for her performance as "It is a Sneha's show all through. The actress is at her best donning the khaakhi. She is agile, fit and active. Especially in stunt sequences, she is at ease." The film was released with 160 prints in Tamil Nadu and in 12 screens in Mumbai, highest for a non-hero movie. On the opening week-end, the movie collected average returns at the box-office.

After the film's success, Kicha planned for a sequel with a fresh script. Sneha said, "It was because of my director I accepted Bhavani since I was initially apprehensive about going for an image makeover. For the sequel, I would take time off and prepare myself before actually getting into action." However the sequel failed to take off.

References

External links 
 
Sneha as Bhavani
Sneha worried for Bhavani
Sneha

2010s Tamil-language films
2011 crime action films
2011 films
Fictional portrayals of the Tamil Nadu Police
Films shot in Chennai
Films shot in Hyderabad, India
Films shot in Tirunelveli
Indian crime action films
Indian films about revenge
Tamil remakes of Telugu films